Ivana Maria Furtado (born 16 March 1999) is a chess prodigy from Goa, India.  She won the Under-8 World Youth Chess Championship twice in a row in 2006 and 2007, and won second place in the 2009 Under-10. Her FIDE Elo rating as of March 2019 is 2139, and she holds the FIDE title of Woman International Master (WIM).

Ivana won gold in the Under 12 category at the Commonwealth Chess Championship 2009 in Singapore on 14 December 2009.

She became Woman FIDE Master in 2011  and became a Woman International Master in June 2012. 

She got her first Woman Grandmaster norm by winning the Girls title at the Asian Junior Chess Championship, Tashkent in June 2012.

See also
 Parimarjan Negi
 Srinath Narayanan
 Sahaj Grover

References

External links
 
 
 Ivana Furtado wins world under-8 Asian Youth Chess Championship 
 

1999 births
Living people
Indian female chess players
World Youth Chess Champions
Sportswomen from Goa
21st-century Indian women
21st-century Indian people
Chess Woman International Masters